Torodora moerens is a moth in the family Lecithoceridae. It was described by László Anthony Gozmány in 2002. It is found in Nepal.

References

Moths described in 2002
Torodora